Shadiwal is a village in the district of Gujrat, Pakistan. It is situated between the rivers Chenab and Jhelum. It was a small village at the end of last century but is now a developed town with a town committee. The development of Shadiwal began with the construction of a power plant on the upper Jhelum canal during the 1960s

References

Villages in Gujrat District